A telecommunication control unit (TCU), line control unit, or terminal control unit (although terminal control unit may also refer to a terminal cluster controller) is a Front-end processor for mainframes and some minicomputers which supports attachment of one or more telecommunication lines. TCUs free processors from handling the data coming in and out of RS-232 ports. The TCU can support multiple terminals, sometimes hundreds. Many of these TCUs can support RS-232 when it is required, although there are other serial interfaces as well.

The advent of ubiquitous TCP/IP has reduced the need for telecommunications control units.

See also
 Terminal access controller
 IBM 270x
 IBM 3705 Communications Controller
 IBM 3720
 IBM 3745

References

Mainframe computers
Networking hardware